Andrea Neumann (1969 – 2020) was a German visual artist and educator. She is one of the most important artists of the Saarland region. She is known for her abstract paintings.

Biography 
Andrea Neumann was born on June 5, 1969, in Stuttgart, Germany. She attended Hochschule der Bildenden Künste Saar (HBK) in Saarland from 1991 until 1996.

Neumann taught art classes periodically at HBK, after her graduation. In 1996, Neumann took over the leadership at ZiegenbART painting school in Saarbrücken. She was active in the Saarland Artists Association, and was on the Board for Saarland Artists House (German: Saarländischer Künstlerhaus).

Neumann often worked in egg tempera on canvas, creating portraits and works featuring groups of people.

She died 19 August 2020, after a serious illness at the age of 51.

Exhibitions 
This is a select list of exhibitions for Neumann.

Solo exhibitions 

 2021 – Übergang, or Zeitspannen, (solo exhibition), Städtische Galerie Neunkirchen, Saar, Germany
 2016 – abkommen, (solo exhibition), Städtische Galerie Neunkirchen, Saar, Germany
2012 – Vice Versa, (solo exhibition), Museum St. Wendel, Sankt Wendel, Germany

Group exhibitions 
2017 – Histoires d’Art 1992, (group exhibition), Cercle Cité, Luxembourg
2009 – Art Venture, (group exhibition), Galerię Miejską BWA, Bydgoszczy, Poland

References 

1969 births
2020 deaths
Artists from Stuttgart
People from Saarland
German women painters
Hochschule der Bildenden Künste Saar alumni